The Primera División or División de Honor of the Liga Nacional de Fútbol Sala, is the premier professional futsal league in Spain. It was founded in 1989 with the name of División de Honor. The Liga Nacional de Fútbol Sala league, which is played under UEFA rules, currently consists of 16 teams, including teams like El Pozo Murcia, Inter Movistar, FC Barcelona, Marfil Santa Coloma, Santiago, Azkar Lugo or Xota Navarra.

The Liga Nacional de Futsal includes:
Primera División de Futsal — 1st level.
Segunda División — 2nd level.

Liga championship rules
Each team of every division has to play with all the other teams of its division twice, once at home and the other at the opponent's stadium. This means that in Liga Nacional de Futbol Sala the league ends after every team plays 30 matches.

Like many other leagues in continental Europe, the Liga Nacional de Futbol Sala takes a winter break once each team has played half its schedule. One unusual feature of the league is that the two halves of the season are played in the same order—that is, the order of each team's first-half fixtures is repeated in the second half of the season, with the only difference being the stadiums used.

Each victory adds 3 points to the team in the league ranking. Each drawn adds 1 point.
At the end of the league, the winner is:
The team that has most points in the ranking.
If two or more teams are level on points, the winner is the team that has the best results head-to-head.
If there is no winner after applying the second rule, then the team with the best overall goal difference wins.

History
 Before the creation of the Liga Nacional de Fútbol Sala in 1989, in Spain were played two futsal championship at the same time, one managed by the Spanish Futsal Federation (FEFS), and the other by the Royal Spanish Football Federation (RFEF). Previously to any futsal league, futsal was limited to benefic and exhibition matches. In 1989, after of years of struggle for the futsal control, the two futsal club associations, ACEFS and ASOFUSA merge to create Liga Nacional de Fútbol Sala.
From 2011–12' season onwards, División de Honor will be known as Primera División.
For the 2012–13 season, the league will be reduce from 16 to 14 teams.

Champions by year
Source:

Performance by club

All-time LNFS table

League or status at 2015–16 season:

Updated at completion of 2014–15 season.

References

External links
Official website

1ª
1
Spain
Sports leagues established in 1989
1989 establishments in Spain
Professional sports leagues in Spain